The Tuu languages, or Taa–ǃKwi (Taa–ǃUi, ǃUi–Taa, Kwi) languages, are a language family consisting of two language clusters spoken in Botswana and South Africa. The relationship between the two clusters is not doubted, but is distant. The name Tuu comes from a word common to both branches of the family for "person".

History 
The ancestor of Tuu languages, Proto-Tuu, was presumably also spoken in or around the Kalahari desert, as a word for the gemsbok (*!hai) is reconstructable to Proto-Tuu.

There is evidence of substantial borrowing of words between Tuu languages and other Khoisan languages, including basic vocabulary. Khoekhoe in particular is thought to have a Tuu (!Ui branch) substrate.

Examples of borrowings from Khoe into Tuu include 'chest' (ǃXóõ gǁúu from Khoe *gǁuu) and 'chin' (Nǁng gǃann from Khoe *ǃann). A root for 'louse' shared by some Khoe and Tuu languages (ǁxóni~kx'uni~kx'uri) has been suggested as deriving from a 'pre-Tuu/pre-Khoe substrate'.

Classification 
The Tuu languages are not demonstrably related to any other language family, though they do share a many similarities to the languages of the Kxʼa family. This is generally thought to be due to thousands of years of contact and mutual influence (a sprachbund), but some scholars believe that the two families may eventually prove not to be orphans.

The Tuu languages were once thought to form a branch of the now-obsolete Khoisan language family, and were thus called Southern Khoisan.

Languages
Taa
ǃXóõ (a dialect cluster)
Lower Nossob (two dialects, ǀʼAuni and Kuǀhaasi) †
ǃKwi (ǃUi)
Nǁng (a dialect cluster; moribund)
ǀXam (a dialect cluster, including Nǀuusaa) †
ǂUngkue †
ǁXegwi †
ǃGãǃne †

The ǃKwi (ǃUi) branch of South Africa is moribund, with only one language extant, Nǁng, and that with fewer than 5 elderly speakers. ǃKwi languages were once widespread across South Africa; the most famous, ǀXam, was the source of the modern national motto of that nation, .

The Taa branch of Botswana is more robust, though it also has only one surviving language, ǃXóõ, with 2,500 speakers.

Because many of the Tuu languages became extinct with little record, there is considerable confusion as to which of their many names represented separate languages or even dialects. The list of Khoisan languages has some possibilities.

There were presumably additional Tuu languages. Westphal studied a Taa variety variously rendered ǀŋamani, ǀnamani, Ngǀamani, ǀŋamasa. It is apparently now extinct. Bleek recorded another now-extinct variety, which she labeled 'S5', in the town of Khakhea; it is known in the literature as Kakia. Another in the Nossop area (labeled 'S4a') is known as Xaitia, Khatia, Katia, Kattea.  Vaalpens, ǀKusi, and ǀEikusi evidently refer to the same variety as Xatia. Westphal (1971) lists them both as Nǀamani dialects, though Köhler lists only Khatia and classifies it as ǃKwi.

The Tuu languages, along with neighboring ǂʼAmkoe, are known for being the only languages in the world to have bilabial clicks as distinctive speech sounds (apart from the extinct ritual jargon Damin of northern Australia, which was not a mother tongue). Taa, ǂʼAmkoe and neighboring Gǀui (of the Khoe family) form a sprachbund (language bond) with some of the most complex inventories of both consonants and vowels in the world. All languages in these three families also have tone.

References

Sources 
Güldemann, Tom. (2006). "The San languages of southern Namibia: Linguistic appraisal with special reference to J. G. Krönlein's Nǀuusaa data." Anthropological Linguistics, 48(4): 369–395.
Story, Robert. (1999). "Kʼuǀha꞉si Manuscript" (MS collections of the Kiǀhazi dialect of Bushman, 1937). Khoisan Forum Working Paper 13. ed. Anthony Traill. Köln: University of Köln. 18–34.

External links 
 Taa at DoBeS, Documentation of endangered languages

 
Language families
Languages of Botswana
Languages of South Africa
Endangered languages
Khoisan languages